Mike Barr may refer to:
Mike Barr (basketball) (born 1950), retired American basketball player
Mike Barr (American football) (born 1978), American football punter
Mike Barr (tennis) (born 1956), tour tennis player in the late 1970s, early 1980s
Mike W. Barr (born 1952), American comics writer

See also
Michael Barr (disambiguation)